The Verona Arena is a Roman amphitheatre in Piazza Bra in Verona, Italy built in 30 AD. It is still in use today and is internationally famous for the large-scale opera performances given there. 

It is one of the best preserved ancient structures of its kind. In ancient times, the arena's capacity was nearly 30,000 people. The stage for concerts and opera performances decreases the available places to a maximum of 22,000.

Amphitheatre

The building itself was built in AD 30 on a site which was then beyond the city walls. The ludi (shows and games) staged there were so famous that spectators came from many other places, often far away, to witness them. The amphitheatre could host more than 30,000 spectators in ancient times.

The round facade of the building was originally composed of white and pink limestone from Valpolicella, but after a major earthquake in 1117, which almost completely destroyed the structure's outer ring, except for the so-called "ala" (wing), the stone was quarried for re-use in other buildings. Nevertheless, it impressed medieval visitors to the city, one of whom considered it to have been a labyrinth, without ingress or egress. Ciriaco d'Ancona was filled with admiration for the way it had been built and Giovanni Antonio Panteo's civic panegyric De laudibus veronae, 1483, remarked that it struck the viewer as a construction that was more than human.

Opera venue

The first interventions to recover the arena's function as an opera venue began during the Renaissance. Some operatic performances were later mounted in the building during the 1850s, owing to its outstanding acoustics.

In 1913, operatic performances in the arena commenced in earnest due to the zeal and initiative of the Italian opera tenor Giovanni Zenatello and the impresario Ottone Rovato. The first 20th-century operatic production at the arena, a staging of Giuseppe Verdi's Aida, took place on 10 August of that year, to mark the birth of Verdi 100 years before in 1813. Musicians Puccini and Mascagni were in attendance. Since then, summer seasons of opera have been mounted continually at the arena, except in 1915–18 and 1940–45, when Europe was convulsed in war.

In modern times, at least four productions (sometimes up to six) are mounted each year between June and August. During the winter months, the local opera and ballet companies perform at the Teatro Filarmonico.

Modern-day travellers are advised that admission tickets to sit on the arena's stone steps are much cheaper to buy than tickets giving access to the padded chairs available on lower levels. Candles are distributed to the audience and lit after sunset around the arena.

Every year over 500,000 people see productions of the popular operas in this arena. Once capable of housing 20,000 patrons per performance (now limited to 15,000 because of safety reasons), the arena has featured many of world's most notable opera singers. In the post-World War II era, they have included Giuseppe Di Stefano, Maria Callas, Tito Gobbi and Renata Tebaldi among other names. A number of conductors have appeared there, too. The official arena shop has historical recordings made by some of them available for sale.

The opera productions in the Verona Arena had not used any microphones or loudspeakers until a sound reinforcement system was installed in 2011.

Arena di Verona Festival

Arena di Verona Festival is a summer festival of opera, inaugurated in 1913 with Giuseppe Verdi's Aida, to celebrate the centenary of the artist's birth.

Other uses

In recent times, the arena has also hosted several concerts of international rock and pop bands, among which Zucchero Fornaciari, who holds the record of the highest number of concerts in the location, 38 from 1989 to 2017, and the highest number of concerts during the same tour, 22 of the Black Cat World Tour, Roger Waters, Bruce Springsteen, Elisa, Eros Ramazzotti, Laura Pausini, Pink Floyd, Alicia Keys, One Direction, Simple Minds (whose concert film Verona was filmed at the venue during their Street Fighting Years Tour on 15 September 1989) Duran Duran, Deep Purple, The Who, Dire Straits, Scatman John, Mike Oldfield, Rod Stewart, Michael Flatley, Yanni, Sting, Pearl Jam, Radiohead, Peter Gabriel, Björk, Muse, Leonard Cohen, Paul McCartney, Jamiroquai, Whitney Houston, Mumford & Sons, Kiss, Spandau Ballet, 5 Seconds Of Summer, Måneskin, 2Cellos and Evanescence.

In 1981, 1984, 2010, 2019 and 2022 it hosted the podium and presentation of the Giro d'Italia.

The closing ceremonies of the Milan—Cortina d'Ampezzo 2026 Winter Olympics, and the opening ceremonies of the 2026 Winter Paralympics, are scheduled to be hosted by the arena.

See also
 List of Roman amphitheatres
 Festivalbar

References

External links

Verona Arena website, in English
Photographs of Arena di Verona
An article on Arena di Verona
Live webcam on Verona Arena
Verona Arena English Video Introduction

Opera houses in Italy
Roman amphitheatres in Italy
Roman sites of Veneto
Buildings and structures in Verona
Tourist attractions in Verona
Venues of the 2026 Winter Olympics